John Yeomans may refer to:
 John Yeomans (writer), Australian journalist and writer
 John William Yeomans, Presbyterian pastor and president of Lafayette College